Yevgeny Yefimovich Chertovsky (born February 15, 1902 - died 1961) was a Soviet Russian inventor who designed the first full pressure suit in Leningrad in 1931.

Chertovsky, an engineer at the Aviation Medicine Institute, was involved in the early Soviet stratospheric balloon program, and co-designed the ill-fated Osoaviakhim-1. The first aircraft designed for crew wearing Chertovsky's pressure suits could have been a gigantic (300,000 cubic meters) USSR-3 balloon that burnt down on launch pad in September 1935.

The CH-1 was a simple pressure-tight suit with helmet which did not have joints, thus requiring substantial force to move the arms and legs when pressurised. This was remedied in CH-2 (1932–1935) and later suits, up to the 1940 CH-7. CH-3 was the first operational suit that allowed the pilot sufficient freedom of movement, first tested in flight in 1937 at a 12 kilometer altitude.

Chertovsky coined the term "skafander" for full pressure suits; from the Greek words skaf ("boat", "ship") and andros ("man"); skafandr has since become the term used by Russians to refer to standard diving dresses or space suits.

Notes

References

External links
Vita Germetika: A Brief History of Creating and Development Soviet-Russian space suits 
<https://gatchina-news.ru/files/site/newspapers/2021/february/gatchina-info_07_ot_18_fevralya_2021_goda.pdf></ref>

Soviet engineers
1902 births
Year of death missing
Date of death unknown
Soviet inventors
1961 deaths